Tennis at the 2019 European Youth Summer Olympic Festival was held at Baku Tennis Academy, Baku, Azerbaijan from 21 to 27 July 2019.

Tennis had doubles and singles events for men and women competition.

Medalists

Medal table

Participating nations
A total of 121 athletes from 36 nations competed in tennis at the 2019 European Youth Summer Olympic Festival:

  (2)
  (4)
  (4)
  (4)
  (4)
  (2)
  (4)
  (4)
  (1)
  (4)
  (2)
  (4)
  (4)
  (2)
  (4)
  (4)
  (4)
  (4)
  (2)
  (3)
  (4)
  (4)
  (2)
  (4)
  (1)
  (4)
  (4)
  (4)
  (4)
  (1)
  (4)
  (4)
  (4)
  (4)
  (3)
  (4)

References

External links
 

 
2019
Tennis
European Youth Summer Olympic Festival
2019 European Youth